Thomas Jefferson High School is a closed public high school located in Rochester, Monroe County, New York, U.S.A., and was one of many high schools operated by the Rochester City School District.

The building is currently used as the Rochester International Academy, a high school for students leaning English as a new language. Until 2020, the building is scheduled to be used as swing space for several elementary schools undergoing renovation, and will eventually become the permanent home to the RIA and a new K-8 school.

Footnotes

High schools in Monroe County, New York
Defunct schools in New York (state)